John Lindsay (1921–2000) was an American politician who served as U.S. Representative from New York and mayor of New York City.

John, Jon or Jack Lindsay may also refer to:

Entertainment
John Lindsay (musician) (1894–1950), American jazz musician
John Jesnor Lindsay (born 1939), Scottish photographer
Jon Lindsay (musician), American musician
Jon Lindsay (Coronation Street), fictional character

Politics
 John Lindsay of Wauchope (died c. 1310), Scottish noble
John Lindsay, 6th Earl of Crawford (died 1513)
John Lindsay, 17th Earl of Crawford, 1st Earl of Lindsay (1596–1678)
John Lindsay, 19th Earl of Crawford (died 1713), Scottish peer and politician
John Lindsay, 20th Earl of Crawford (1702–1749), Scottish peer and the first colonel of the Black Watch
John Lindsay (South Australian politician) (1821–1898), businessman and politician in South Australia
John Lindsay (Western Australian politician) (1876–1957), politician in Western Australia
Jon Lindsay (born 1935), member of Texas Senate, 1997–2007

Sports 
Jack Lindsay (footballer, born 1921) (1921–2006), Scottish footballer who played for Bury, Carlisle United, Southport and Wigan Athletic
Johnny Lindsay (John Dixon Lindsay, 1908–1990), South African cricketer 
John Lindsay (New Zealand cricketer) (born 1957), New Zealand cricketer
John Lindsay (footballer, born 1862) (1862–1932), Scottish association football player for Scotland and Accrington F.C.
John Lindsay (footballer, born 1900) (1900–?), Scottish association football player for Partick Thistle, Rhyl Athletic, Liverpool, Swansea Town and Bangor City
John Lindsay (footballer, born 1924) (1924–1991), Scottish association football player for Rangers and Everton
John Lindsay (Paralympian) (born 1970), Australian Paralympian

Others
Jack Lindsay (1900–1990), Australian-born British writer and poet
John de Lindsay (died 1335), bishop of Glasgow
John Lindsay, 5th Lord Lindsay (died 1563), Scottish judge
John Lindsay of Balcarres, Lord Menmuir (1552–1598), chancellor of the University of St Andrews, 1597–1598
John Lindsay (Royal Navy officer) (1737–1788), British naval officer and father of Dido Elizabeth Belle

See also
John Lindesay (died 1751), founder of the settlement of Cherry Valley, Otsego County, New York
John Lindsey (born 1977), baseball player
John Lindsey (1909–1975), writer.